Buckland Abbey is a Grade I listed 700-year-old house in Buckland Monachorum, near Yelverton, Devon, England, noted for its connection with Sir Richard Grenville the Younger and Sir Francis Drake. It is owned by  the National Trust.

Monastic history
Buckland Abbey was founded as a Cistercian abbey in 1278 by Amicia, Countess of Devon and was a daughter house of Quarr Abbey, on the Isle of Wight. It was one of the last Cistercian houses founded in England and also the most westerly.

In the Bishop of Exeter episcopal registers show the abbey managed five granges at Buckland plus the home farm at the abbey. A market and fair at Buckland and Cullompton were granted in 1318. In 1337 King Edward III granted the monks a licence to crenellate.

It is Grade I listed

It remained an abbey until the Dissolution of the Monasteries by King Henry VIII. At this time the revenues were placed at £241 17s. 9d. per annum. The Abbot was given a yearly pension of £60, and the remaining 12 monks shared £54 10s. 6d.

Abbots

Post monastic history
In 1541 Henry sold Buckland to Sir Richard Grenville the Elder (Sewer of the Chamber to Henry VIII, poet, soldier, last Earl Marshall of Calais) who, working with his son Sir Roger Greynvile (Gentleman of the Privy Chamber of Henry VIII, Captain of the ill-fated Mary Rose), began to convert the abbey into a residence, renaming it Buckland Greynvile. Sir Roger died in 1545 when the Mary Rose heeled over in a sudden squall while the English Fleet was engaged with the French Fleet in the Narrow Sea off Portsmouth. He left a son aged 3, also named Richard Grenville, who completed the conversion in 1575–76. After being owned by the family for 40 years, Buckland Greynvile was sold by Sir Richard the Younger to two intermediaries in 1581, who unknown to Grenyvile, were working for Drake, whom he despised. The abbey is unusual in that the church was retained as the principal component of the new house whilst most of the remainder was demolished, which was a reversal of the normal outcome with this type of redevelopment.

Drake lived in the house for 15 years, as did many of his collateral descendants including the Dowager Lady Seaton, Born Elisabeth Fuller-Elliot-Drake, who died on 9 May 1937. She left a life interest to Captain Richard Owen Tapps Gervis Meyrick. In 1946 he sold it to Captain Arthur Rodd,  who presented the property to the National Trust in 1947.

Buckland today

Following a restoration between 1948 and 1951 which cost around £20,000, largely funded by the Pilgrim Trust the property has been open to the public since 1951 and is operated by the National Trust with the assistance of Plymouth City Council — the Plymouth City Museum and Art Gallery use the building to house part of their collection. The collection is noted for the presence of "Drake's Drum". A number of independent craft workshops are located in the converted ox sheds. The Cider House garden includes both a wild garden and a kitchen garden. There is also a medieval Great Barn next to the house.

In March 2013 the portrait of a man wearing a white feathered bonnet was re-attributed to Rembrandt by the Rembrandt expert Ernst van de Wetering. In June 2014, after eight months of work at the Hamilton Kerr Institute, the painting's authenticity was confirmed and its value estimated at £30m.

Costume Group

The National Trust Costume Group operate at Buckland Abbey, creating authentic Elizabethan costumes using traditional materials and methods. There is a complete Francis Drake costume, based on the famous portrait of Drake in the National Gallery, and the group are currently working on a costume for Lady Drake, also based on a portrait.

See also
 Drake baronets
 Fuller baronets
 Baron Seaton
 Cestui que

References

External links
Buckland Abbey information at the National Trust
List of paintings on view

Cistercian monasteries in England
Country houses in Devon
National Trust properties in Devon
Grade I listed churches in Devon
Monasteries in Devon
Museums in Devon
Historic house museums in Devon
1278 establishments in England
Christian monasteries established in the 13th century
Francis Drake
Grade I listed monasteries
Monasteries dissolved under the English Reformation